Northwest Nazarene University (NNU) is a private Nazarene university in Nampa, Idaho.

History

Eugene Emerson organized a combination grade school and Bible school in 1913 as Idaho Holiness School. It was renamed twice in 1916, first to Northwest Holiness College and then to Northwest Nazarene College, and then became a liberal arts college in 1917 with degree-granting authority from the Idaho state Board of Education. While the college's first president, elected in 1916, was H. Orton Wiley of Pasadena University, Fred J. Shields filled in as acting president before leaving for the Eastern Nazarene College in 1919, while Wiley finished his graduate work.

Under Russell V. DeLong, Northwest Nazarene College (NNC) received educational accreditation as a two-year school in 1931 and as a four-year school in 1937, making it the first accredited college affiliated with the Church of the Nazarene. Under Presidents John E. Riley and Kenneth H. Pearsall in the 1960s and 1970s, master's degree programs were added. It was renamed Northwest Nazarene University (NNU) in 1999.

Northwest Nazarene University was granted an exception to Title IX in 2014 which allows it to legally discriminate against LGBT students for religious reasons.

Affiliations

As one of eight U.S. liberal arts colleges affiliated with the Church of the Nazarene, the college receives financial backing from the Nazarene churches on its region; part of each church budget is paid into a fund for its regional school. Each college is also bound by a gentlemen's agreement not to actively recruit outside its respective educational region.

NNU is the church's college for the Northwest Region of the United States, which comprises the Alaska, Washington Pacific, Oregon Pacific, Northwest, Intermountain, Rocky Mountain, and Colorado districts, which include Washington, Oregon, Idaho, Montana, Wyoming, Colorado, Alaska, and parts of Nevada and Utah. NNU is also a member of the Council for Christian Colleges and Universities (CCCU). NNU has been accredited by the Northwest Commission on Colleges and Universities (NWCCU) since 1930, making it the first Nazarene school to achieve an accredited status.

Academics
Northwest Nazarene University has two colleges: the College of Arts and Sciences and the College of Adult and Graduate Studies. NNU offers over 60 baccalaureate degree programs, 11 master's degree programs, a Ph.D. degree program, and a Doctor of Psychology (Psy.D.) in clinical psychology. In addition to its  campus in Nampa, ID, the university offers extensive online degree programs and has branch campuses in Boise, Twin Falls, and Idaho Falls.

Founded in 1913, the university now serves over 1300 undergraduate and 700 graduate students, more than 6000 online and continuing education students, and high school concurrent credit students.  NNU is accredited by the Northwest Commission on Colleges and Universities.

Student life
NNU is a co-educational college according to InsideHigherEd and the Council for Christian Colleges and Universities

LGBTQ students
NNU is ranked among the "Absolute Worst Campuses for LGBTQ Youth" in the US by Campus Pride. The Church of the Nazarene Manual 2017–2021 states that "we believe the practice of same-sex sexual intimacy is contrary to God’s will for human sexuality". The university's Notice of Non-discrimination states that "The University maintains the right, with regard to its lifestyle covenant, employment, and other matters, to uphold and apply its religious beliefs related to, among other issues, marriage, sex (gender), gender identity, sexual orientation, and sexual activity."

Athletics

The Northwest Nazarene (NNU) athletic teams are called the Nighthawks (formerly known as Crusaders until October 15, 2017). The university is a member of the Division II level of the National Collegiate Athletic Association (NCAA), primarily competing in the Great Northwest Athletic Conference (GNAC) since the 2001–02 academic year. The Nighthawks previously competed in the D-II Pacific West Conference (PacWest) during the 2000–01 school year; and in the Cascade Collegiate Conference (CCC) of the National Association of Intercollegiate Athletics (NAIA) from 1993–94 to 1999–2000.

NNU competes in 13 intercollegiate varsity sports: Men's sports include baseball, basketball, cross country, golf, soccer and track & field; while women's sports include basketball, cross country, golf, soccer, softball, track & field and volleyball.

Along with Eastern Nazarene College, Point Loma Nazarene University, Southern Nazarene University, and Trevecca Nazarene University, it is one of five Nazarene colleges to compete in the NCAA; while Point Loma Nazarene only competes in the NAIA.

Notable people
Notable graduates include Lori Otter First Lady of the State of Idaho. Kent R. Hill, the former administrator for USAID's Bureau for Global Health and former president of the Eastern Nazarene College (1992-2001), Richard Hieb, NASA astronaut, author Donna Fletcher Crow, and Michael Lodahl and Thomas Jay Oord, Nazarene theologians. A notable non-graduate alumna is Mildred Bangs Wynkoop, another Nazarene theologian. Notable former faculty members include Fred J. Shields, H. Orton Wiley, and Olive Winchester. Religious speaker and author Ann Kiemel Anderson attended the university.

Notes

References

External links
 Official website
 Official athletics website

 
Educational institutions established in 1913
Universities and colleges affiliated with the Church of the Nazarene
Private universities and colleges in Idaho
Council for Christian Colleges and Universities
Universities and colleges accredited by the Northwest Commission on Colleges and Universities
Buildings and structures in Canyon County, Idaho
Education in Canyon County, Idaho
1913 establishments in Idaho